Alfonso Patiño Rosselli (1923 – 7 November 1985) was a Colombian jurist and diplomat who died in the 1985 Palace of Justice Siege by the M-19 where he was a Magistrate and President of the Constitutional Chamber of the Supreme Court of Colombia. He also served as the 10th Permanent Representative of Colombia to the United Nations, the 46th Minister of Finance and Public Credit of Colombia, Ambassador of Colombia to Uruguay, and Governor of Boyacá.

References

1923 births
1985 deaths
People from Sogamoso
Colombian Conservative Party politicians
Ministers of Finance and Public Credit of Colombia
Governors of Boyacá Department
Assassinated Colombian people
Universidad Externado de Colombia alumni
Ambassadors of Colombia to Uruguay
Magistrates of the Supreme Court of Justice of Colombia
Permanent Representatives of Colombia to the United Nations
20th-century Colombian judges